Laurent Dorique (born 10 July 1976) is a French track and field athlete who competes in the javelin throw. He was the gold medallist at the 2001 Mediterranean Games and the 2001 Francophonie Games. He was three times a gold medallist for his native Réunion at the Indian Ocean Island Games, winning in 1993, 1998 and 2011.

International competitions

National titles
French Athletics Championships
Javelin throw: 2000, 2001, 2008, 2011

See also
List of javelin throw national champions (men)

References

External links

Living people
1976 births
Athletes from Réunion
French male javelin throwers
Mediterranean Games gold medalists for France
Athletes (track and field) at the 2001 Mediterranean Games
Mediterranean Games medalists in athletics
Competitors at the 2001 Summer Universiade